Political Spring (Politiki Anixi) was a Greek conservative political party founded in June 1993 by Antonis Samaras. The party was formed after Antonis Samaras broke away from the governing New Democracy party after being dismissed as Foreign Minister over his hardline stance on the Macedonia naming dispute.

Political Spring gained 4.9% in the National Elections of 1993 earning ten seats in the Parliament. It gained 8.7% in the elections for the European Parliament in 1994 earning two seats. Its decline started in the National Elections of 1996, when it gained 2.94%, just below the national threshold of 3%, thus not being able to earn any seats in the Parliament. It participated in the elections for European Parliament in 1999, but it got 2.3% which was again below the threshold and considered a major failure leading to gradual dissolution of the party. Political Spring did not participate in the elections of 2000, but Antonis Samaras publicly supported the New Democracy party. Before the next general elections in April 2004, Samaras rejoined New Democracy and he was elected as an MEP in June 2004.

Electoral results

References 

Conservative parties in Greece
Defunct nationalist parties in Greece
Eastern Orthodox political parties
1993 establishments in Greece
Political parties established in 1993
2000 disestablishments in Greece
Political parties disestablished in 2000
1990s in Greek politics